The East Pakistan Provincial Assembly, known as the East Bengal Legislative Assembly between 1947 and 1955, was the provincial legislature of East Pakistan between 1947 and 1971. It was known as the East Bengal Assembly from 1947 to 1955 when the provincial name was changed. The legislature was a successor to the Bengal Legislative Council and the Bengal Legislative Assembly, which were divided between East Bengal and West Bengal during the partition of Bengal in 1947. It was the largest provincial legislature in Pakistan. Elections were held only twice in 1954 and 1970.

During the Bangladesh War of Independence in 1971, most Bengali members elected to the Pakistani National Assembly and the East Pakistani provincial assembly became members of the Constituent Assembly of Bangladesh.

History

Partition of Bengal
On 20 June 1947, 141 East Bengali legislators from the Bengal Legislative Assembly voted on the partition of Bengal, with 107 supporting joining Pakistan's Constituent Assembly if India was partitioned. The Sylhet region in Assam voted in a referendum to join East Bengal. After the creation of the Dominion of Pakistan, those 141 legislators, in addition to legislators from Sylhet of the Assam Legislative Assembly, formed the East Bengal Legislative Assembly. The Muslim League's Sir Khawaja Nazimuddin became the first chief minister. He was succeeded by Nurul Amin in 1948. The assembly was housed in Jagannath Hall, within the vicinity of the University of Dacca and the High Court of Dacca. The area was the center of the Bengali Language Movement in 1952.

Land reform
The assembly passed the East Bengal State Acquisition and Tenancy Act of 1950. The act repealed the earlier laws and regulations which formed the permanent settlement during British rule.

United Front comes to power
The United Front coalition, led by the Krishak Praja Party and the Awami League, routed the Muslim League during the provincial general election in 1954. The Farmer and Labour Party leader A. K. Fazlul Huq became chief minister for six weeks. The United Front called for complete autonomy in East Bengal, except in defence and foreign policy; and the recognition of Bengali as a federal language. The East Bengal Legislative Assembly passed a law for the establishment of the Bengali Academy. However, Huq's government was dismissed within two months. Huq was placed under house arrest. After a period of Governor General's rule, Abu Hussain Sarkar became chief minister in 1955.

One Unit and 1956 Constitution
As a result of the One Unit scheme, the assembly was renamed as the East Pakistan Provincial Assembly in 1955. Pakistan became a republic under the Constitution of Pakistan of 1956, in which Bengali was recognized as a federal language as a concession to East Pakistan.

In 1957, the East Pakistan Provincial Assembly adopted a unanimous resolution demanding full autonomy.
Ataur Rahman Khan became chief minister in 1956.

Martial law
In 1958, a brawl broke out between political factions in the assembly, resulting in the deputy speaker Shahed Ali Patwary being injured. Patwary later died. The confrontation was used as a pretext by President Iskander Mirza to declare martial law on 7 October 1958. The chief of army staff Ayub Khan was appointed Chief Martial Law Administrator. Khan later assumed the presidency by replacing Mirza. All provincial assemblies, including in East Pakistan, were disbanded. Numerous political leaders and journalists were arrested. The Elected Bodies Disqualification Order barred 75 politicians from holding public office for eight years (until 1966).

1962 Constitution
The Constitution of Pakistan of 1962 abolished the parliamentary system and introduced a presidential and gubernatorial system at the federal and provincial levels respectively. The most important feature of the system was dubbed "Basic Democracy", in which electoral colleges would be responsible for electing the President of Pakistan and Governors of East and West Pakistan.

In 1962, Dacca was declared Pakistan's legislative capital. During the 1960s, the East Pakistan Provincial Assembly was housed in Parliament House in Tejgaon. The National Assembly of Pakistan would periodically convene in the same building. The building is now the Prime Minister's Office of Bangladesh.

In 1966, the six points of the Awami League demanded a federal parliamentary democracy.

Return of Martial Law
In 1969, President Ayub Khan was deposed by the army chief Yahya Khan. The 1969 uprising in East Pakistan played a role in the overthrow of President Ayub Khan. The new ruler Yahya Khan organized general elections in 1970 based on universal suffrage (the first in Pakistan's history), in which the Awami League won 288 of the 300 seats in East Pakistan's provincial assembly. The refusal of the Pakistani military junta to transfer power led to the Bangladesh Liberation War in 1971.

Bangladeshi Constituent Assembly
Following the Pakistani military crackdown in East Pakistan that began on 25 March 1971, most members of the East Pakistan Provincial Assembly and the Bengali members of the National Assembly of Pakistan convened in Boiddonathtala, Meherpur on 17 April 1971, where they signed the Proclamation of Bangladesh Independence that was declared on 26 March and rebroadcast on 27 March.

Elections

East Bengal legislative election, 1954

The 1954 election in East Bengal was the first election since Pakistan was created. It was held on the basis of separate electorates, with reserved seats including 228 for the Muslim electorate, 30 for the general electorate, 36 for the scheduled caste electorate, 1 for the Pakistan Christian electorate, 12 for the womens' electorate and 1 for the Buddhist electorate.

The Awami League emerged as the single largest party. However, in response to popular demands, the United Front Legislative Party elected Krishak Sramik Party leader A K Fazlul Huq, a former Prime Minister of Bengal, as Leader of the House. Huq was invited by the governor on 3 April 1954 to form the government. The election ended the dominance of the Muslim League in the politics of East Bengal. It heralded a younger generation of legislators from the vernacular middle class. But verdict had little impact on Pakistan's central leadership and bureaucracy.

East Pakistan general election, 1970
The 1970 general election broke with the tradition of separate electorates and was organized on the basis of universal adult franchise. The results are given in the following.

The newly elected assembly could not convene due to the Pakistani military crackdown in East Pakistan. During the Bangladesh War of Independence, the Proclamation of Bangladeshi Independence was signed by most of its members, which transformed the assembly into a part of the Constituent Assembly of Bangladesh, alongside Bengali members of the National Assembly of Pakistan.

Ministries
A total of five ministries (parliamentary governments) were formed by Chief Ministers in the assembly.

List of Chief Ministers

See also
Parliament of Bangladesh

References

Government of East Pakistan
1947 establishments in East Pakistan
1971 disestablishments in Pakistan
Provincial Assemblies of Pakistan
Historical legislatures in Bangladesh